Kabhi To Milenge is an Indian television series that aired on Zee TV based on the story of a woman who has been wrongly convicted for the murder of her own husband. The series premiered on 2 July 2001, and aired every Monday to Friday at 10pm IST. It starred known Bollywood film actress Rati Agnihotri in the main lead and was directed by known Bollywood film director Anant Mahadevan who also worked in the series.

Cast
 Rati Agnihotri
 Tanaaz Currim
 Tom Alter
 Vijayendra Ghatge
 Anant Mahadevan
 Sadhana Singh
 Sumeet Saigal
 Shiva Rindani
 Anang Desai
 Renuka Israni
 Suhas Khandke
 Hussain Kuwajerwala
 Bakul Thakkar
Sonam Malhotra
 Rakesh Pandey
Suva Joshi
 Vaidehi
 Vijay Gokhale
 Hemant Choudhary
 Paramveer

References

External links

Zee TV original programming
Indian drama television series
Indian television soap operas
2001 Indian television series debuts